Homopholis is a genus of geckos found in Sub-Saharan Africa. Their diet consists of small insects, and they are oviparous.

Species
There are four species:
 Homopholis arnoldi 
 Homopholis fasciata  — banded velvet gecko, striped velvet gecko
 Homopholis mulleri  — Muller's velvet gecko
 Homopholis walbergii  — Wahlberg's velvet gecko

Nota bene: A binomial authority in parentheses indicates that the species was originally described in a genus other than Homopholis.

References

Further reading
Boulenger GA (1885). Catalogue of the Lizards in the British Museum (Natural History). Second Edition. Volume I. Geckonidæ ... London: Trustees of the British Museum (Natural History). (Taylor and Francis, printers). xii + 436 pp. + Plates I-XXXII. (Homopholis, new genus, p. 191).

 
Geckos
Reptiles of Africa
Lizard genera
Taxa named by George Albert Boulenger